Cossack is a suburb of the town of Katherine, Northern Territory, Australia. It is within the Katherine Town Council local government area. The area was officially defined as a suburb in April 2007, adopting the name from white émigré farmers who settled in the area.

The locality consists mostly of rural land holdings mixed with some smaller farms and residences, however there is also a small industrial area and power station close to the Stuart Highway.

References

Suburbs of Katherine, Northern Territory